Colo Colo is a historic tugboat of the Chilean Navy built in Scotland for Chile in 1931. She was a steamship until she was reconditioned in 1971, at which time she was re-engined as a motor vessel. She spent her service career in southern Chile.

During the Chilean naval mutiny of 1931 she chased the Chilean submarine Rucumilla near the Quiriquina Island. 

In 1987 she was withdrawn from service and preserved at the Chilean Navy Museum at Punta Arenas.

References

See also
 List of decommissioned ships of the Chilean Navy
 Chilean ship Colo Colo

Ships built on the River Clyde
1931 ships
Auxiliary ships of the Chilean Navy
Tugboats
Museum ships in Chile
Punta Arenas